Tillandsia limbata is a plant species in the genus Tillandsia. This species is endemic to Mexico.

Cultivars
 Tillandsia 'Durrell'
 Tillandsia 'Gusher'

References
 
BSI Cultivar Registry Retrieved 11 October 2009

limbata
Flora of Mexico